Ludiortyx is a bird genus from the Late Eocene. Its remains have been found in the Montmartre Formation at the Montmartre (Paris, France). A single species is accepted, Ludiortyx hoffmanni.

This bird is of uncertain relationships; it has been variously considered to be an ancestral rail or to belong to the Quercymegapodiidae, a prehistoric group of Galliformes (landfowl). The material assigned to it were initially considered to be of 2 species, one that was at first believed to be a Tringa wader, the other assigned to the galliform genus Palaeortyx. Even the latter assignment was probably much in error as though its relationships are not known, Palaeortyx was probably not a quercymegapodiid.

Synonyms
Apart from the genus-level synonym Eortyx, L. hoffmanni has undergone quite a number of name changes due to the confusion about its placement: 
 Tringa hoffmanni Gervais, 1852
 Palaeortyx hoffmanni (Gervais, 1852)
 Palaeortyx blanchardi Milne-Edwards, 1869
 Ludiortyx blanchardi (Milne-Edwards, 1869)
 Eortyx hoffmanni (Gervais, 1852)

Footnotes

References
  (2002): Cenozoic Birds of the World, Part 1: Europe. Ninox Press, Prague.  PDF fulltext

Bird genera
Eocene birds
Gruiformes
Quercymegapodiidae
Fossils of France
Fossil taxa described in 1964